Seabron Jesse “Red” Booles (July 14, 1880 – March 16, 1955) was a Major League Baseball pitcher who played for one season. He played for the Cleveland Naps from July 30, 1909, to August 20, 1909.

External links

1880 births
1955 deaths
Cleveland Naps players
Major League Baseball pitchers
Baseball players from Louisiana
Shreveport Pirates (baseball) players
Raleigh Red Birds players
People from Bernice, Louisiana